Maskeblomstfamilien is a novel by the Norwegian author Lars Saabye Christensen. Maskeblomstfamilien was published in 2003 by Cappelen. The novel is about a troubled boy and his voyage to a total and certain downfall after his father dies young, and his mother consequently becomes mentally ill. The book is written in the author's highly poetic style, and is distinctive in its enigmatic issues and obscure messages.

2003 novels
21st-century Norwegian novels
Novels by Lars Saabye Christensen
J.W. Cappelens Forlag books